Dick Rude (born 1964) is a director, actor and writer known for his appearances in and contributions to many Alex Cox films including a starring role in 1986's Straight to Hell, for which he also served as a writer and contributed to the soundtrack. Rude directed the Red Hot Chili Peppers music videos "Catholic School Girls Rule", "Fight Like a Brave", and "Universally Speaking" as well as their live concert DVD Off the Map.

His most recent film is Let's Rock Again!, a 2004 documentary that documented the final tour of musician Joe Strummer shortly before his death in 2002.

Filmography

Actor
 Rock 'n' Roll Hotel (1984)
 Repo Man (1984) - Duke
 The Wild Life (1984) - Eddie
 Night of the Comet (1984) - Stock Boy
 Straight to Hell (1986) - Willy
 Sid and Nancy (1986) - Riker's Guard
 Walker (1987) - Washburn
 Tokyo no kyujitsu (1991) - Johnny Elvis Rotten
 Roadside Prophets (1992) - Two Free Stooges
 Lolamoviola: Dead Souls (1993) - Man
 The GoodTimesKid (2005) - Tough Guy

Director
 Catholic School Girls Rule (1985) (Red Hot Chili Peppers music video)
 Fight Like a Brave (1987) (Red Hot Chili Peppers music video)
 Off the Map (2001) (Red Hot Chili Peppers live DVD)
 Universally Speaking (2003) (Red Hot Chili Peppers music video)
 Let's Rock Again! (2004) (Joe Strummer documentary)

External links
Official page

1964 births
Living people
American male film actors
Writers from Los Angeles
Place of birth missing (living people)